The 2nd Newcastle Journal Trophy was a non-championship Formula Two motor race held at Charterhall on 15 August 1953. The race was won by Ken Wharton in a Cooper T20-Bristol. Roy Salvadori and Ron Flockhart were second and third in their Connaught A Type-Lea Francises All three shared fastest lap.

Results

References

Newcastle Journal Trophy
Newcastle
Newcastle
Newcastle Journal Trophy
Newcastle Journal Trophy